Elizabeth Pakenham, Countess of Longford,  (née Harman; 30 August 1906 – 23 October 2002), better known as Elizabeth Longford, was a British historian. She was a member of the Royal Society of Literature and was on the board of trustees of the National Portrait Gallery in London.  She is best known as a historian, especially for her biographies of 19th-century aristocrats such as Queen Victoria (1964), Lord Byron (1976) and the Duke of Wellington (1969).

Early life
Elizabeth Harman was born on 30 August 1906 at 108 Harley Street in Marylebone, London. The daughter of eye specialist Nathaniel Bishop Harman, she was educated at the Francis Holland School, Headington School and was an undergraduate at Lady Margaret Hall, Oxford. "Able, articulate and beautiful", in the words of The New York Times, she was "the Zuleika Dobson of her day, with undergraduates and even dons tumbling over one another to fall in love with her". A few years after her graduation, on 3 November 1931, she married Frank Pakenham, later 7th Earl of Longford, who died in August 2001. Her obituary by the BBC said the marriage was "famously harmonious."  The New York Times, in its review of The Pebbled Shore, called Lady Longford "easily the best writer in what is predominantly a literary family".

She and her husband were both devout Roman Catholic converts, Lady Longford having been raised a Unitarian, and avid social reformers. The Longfords had eight children, among them the writers Lady Antonia Fraser, Lady Rachel Billington, Judith Kazantzis, and Thomas Pakenham. Her brother, John B. Harman, was a physician; his daughter is Labour politician Harriet Harman. Lady Longford was a great-niece of the politician Joseph Chamberlain and a first cousin once removed of the British prime minister Neville Chamberlain.

Political career
She made several unsuccessful attempts to win election to the House of Commons as a Labour MP. In 1935 she contested Cheltenham, which was a safely Conservative seat, and in 1950 she was defeated by Quintin Hogg at Oxford. Through the war she had sought selection at Birmingham King's Norton until she felt compelled to cease her candidacy upon her sixth pregnancy in 1944; the seat was a Labour gain in 1945 by 12,000 votes.

Death 
Longford died on 23 October 2002, aged 96, at Bernhurst in Hurst Green, East Sussex.

Publications

 Victoria R.I. (1964) Awarded the James Tait Black Memorial Prize
 Wellington: The Years of the Sword (1969) and Wellington: Pillar Of State (1972), a two-volume biography of the first Duke of Wellington, who numbered among her husband's relatives.
 The Royal House of Windsor (1974)
 Winston Churchill (1974)
 
 Byron (1976)
 A Pilgrimage of Passion: The Life of Wilfrid Scawen Blunt (1979) (I.B. Tauris, re-issued 2007)
 
 Jameson's Raid (1982)
 Elizabeth R: A Biography (1983)

References

Citations

Bibliography

External links
"Lady Longford dies aged 96", BBC News, 2002
Elizabeth Longford , obituary by The Times 
 "Elizabeth Longford (Elizabeth, Countess of Longford)", Fellows Remembered, The Royal Society of Literature

1906 births
2002 deaths
Alumni of Lady Margaret Hall, Oxford
British biographers
English Roman Catholics
Commanders of the Order of the British Empire
Converts to Roman Catholicism
British socialists
People educated at Francis Holland School
Elizabeth
Historians of the Napoleonic Wars
James Tait Black Memorial Prize recipients
20th-century British historians
British women historians
Fellows of the Royal Society of Literature
Labour Party (UK) parliamentary candidates
Wives of knights
Women biographers
Spouses of life peers